Suniana lascivia, the dingy grass-dart or dingy dart, is a butterfly of the family Hesperiidae. It is found in Australia (New South Wales, Northern Territory, Queensland, Victoria, Western Australia), Papua New Guinea and Indonesia.

The wingspan is about 20 mm.

The larvae feed on Panicum maximum and Imperata cylindrica species. During the day, it rests in a vertical shelter formed by joining leaves of the host plant with silk.

External links
Australian Insects
Australian Faunal Directory

Hesperiinae
Butterflies described in 1885